Reginald Vaughn Finley Sr. (born 1974) is an American skeptic, activist, and online host.

He follows in the tradition of his great-grandmother, Dr. Mary Alice Person LaSaine (1882-1957), an early black educator. He is a US Army veteran, and served overseas during Operation Able Sentry in 1995.

He worked as a "phone psychic" with the psychic network. He said he was amazed at how the callers didn't realize that they were the ones providing the information. Finley gave a talk about his methods to a Center for Inquiry conference in 2001.

While attending St. Leo College at Fort McPherson, he studied philosophy and religion, and soon became interested in the effect of "bad ideas" and the lack of scientific knowledge of the general public. Lacking a religious identity, he shortly began identifying himself as a freethinker and critical thinker.

Finley took a hiatus from school and began his 12-year internet media career with an internet radio show, The Infidel Guy Show (1999-2010), which focused on educating the public about science, philosophy, ethics, freethought, and the value of critical thinking.

Finley's programs, Freethought Radio and The Infidel Guy Show, featured personalities from across the philosophical and scientific spectrum, including scientists Michio Kaku and Richard Dawkins, lawyer Michael Newdow, creationist Kent Hovind, Ali Sina of Faith Freedom International, philosopher Massimo Pigliucci, and Michael Shermer, founder of the Skeptics Society. At its end, Finley had produced over 600 programs.

Finley's family appeared on ABC's reality show Wife Swap on November 28, 2005, in which his then-wife Amber switched places with the wife of a devout Christian pastor.

Finley returned to school, graduating from Amridge University (2011), and completed his master's degree at SUNY at Buffalo (2013). He has also attended Clemson University back in 2016. He is currently enrolled in a doctoral program at Euclid University.

His latest projects include AmazingLife.Bio, a biology education website for grades 5 through 12, in which he educates visitors about the diversity of life on planet Earth. He also offers online tutoring services in biology. His other project, Cancer Cure Scams, is a site devoted to protecting cancer patients against dangerous alternative medicine practitioners and educating the public on how to properly understand and interpret science.

Finley is currently an instructor in Orlando, Florida, and has taught courses at community colleges.

Publications 

 On Teaching Evolution, contributing author, Keystone Canyon Press 2021

References

External links
 The Fun Scientists Facebook Page, Finley's new children's entertainment business, accessed June 2, 2013.
 White, Gayle. "Secular America: Atheists uncomfortable as wounded nation turns more to religion", The Atlanta Journal-Constitution,  October 20, 2001, p. 1B.
 Thinking Beyond The Standard - ReginaldFinley.com, personal page and free show and media archives site
 Amazing Life.Bio
 Cancer Cure Scams
 QuestionsAboutGod.com
 FamilyOriginsTree.com, Finley's genealogy site
 InfidelGuy.com, a site that is an archive of The Infidel Guy Show

1974 births
African-American radio personalities
Living people
University at Buffalo alumni
21st-century African-American people
20th-century African-American people